Dayana Octavien (born June 10, 1982) is a Haitian-American track and field athlete who competes internationally for Haiti.

Octavien competed in the 2008 Summer Olympics for Haiti in the discus event. She placed sixth the year prior in the Pan American Games. While attending college at the University of South Florida, Octavien was a two-time All-American, won seven Conference USA titles in three events (discus, weight throw and hammer), and was named the C-USA Women's Track and Field Athlete of the Year in three straight seasons. After her time with the Bulls, she was inducted into the University of South Florida Athletic Hall of Fame in 2013.

Dayana is the older sister of former NFL player Steve Octavien.

References 

University of South Florida alumni
University of South Florida olympians
South Florida Bulls women's track and field athletes
Haitian athletes
1982 births
Living people
Athletes (track and field) at the 2007 Pan American Games
Pan American Games competitors for Haiti